The 2011 CHIO Rotterdam was the 2011 edition of the CHIO Rotterdam, the Dutch official show jumping horse show. It was held as CSIO 5*.

The first (national) horse show were held 1937 in Rotterdam, in 1948 it became an international horse show.

Former editions of the CHIO Rotterdam were held in June. In 2011, also the European Dressage Championship was held on the CHIO area. Because of this, the 2011 CHIO Rotterdam was held one week after the European Dressage Championship (August 25, 2011 and June 28, 2011) without dressage competitions. The main sponsor of the 2011 CHIO Rotterdam horse show was the Rabobank.

FEI Nations Cup of the Netherlands 
The 2011 FEI Nations Cup of the Netherlands was part of the 2011 CHIO Rotterdam. As a result of the late date of the 2011 CHIO the Dutch Nations Cup was - first time - the last competition of the 2011 Meydan FEI Nations Cup. 

The 2011 FEI Nations Cup of the Netherlands was held at Friday, August 26, 2011 at 5:15 pm. The competing teams were: Germany, the Netherlands, Denmark, the United Kingdom (Great Britain), the United States of America, Ireland, Belgium and France.

The competition was a show jumping competition with two rounds and optionally one jump-off. The height of the fences were up to 1.60 meters.

The competition is endowed with 200,000 €.

(grey penalties points do not count for the team result)

Longines Grand Prix Port of Rotterdam 
The Grand Prix was the mayor show jumping competition of the 2011 CHIO Rotterdam. The sponsor of this competition was Longines. It was held at Sunday, August 28, 2011 at 2:30 pm. The competition was a show jumping competition with one round and one jump-off, the height of the fences were up to 1.60 meters.

(Top 5 of 47 Competitors)

References

External links 
 
 timetable
 2011 results

CHIO Rotterdam
CHIO Rotterdam
CHIO Rotterdam